Orchard Beach is an unincorporated community in Anne Arundel County, Maryland, United States.
The community lies outside the Baltimore Beltway, approximately four miles from its nearest interchange. It lies on a peninsula that has about two miles of shoreline and about a dozen named streets.

References

Unincorporated communities in Anne Arundel County, Maryland
Unincorporated communities in Maryland